Emory Melton (June 20, 1923 – December 26, 2015) was an American politician who served in the Missouri State Senate. He was born in McDowell, Missouri and attended Southwest Missouri State University and the University of Missouri in Columbia, studying law. He served in the Missouri State Senate for the 29th district 1972 to 1996. He was a member of the Republican party. Melton died on December 26, 2015, at his home in Cassville, Missouri.

References

1923 births
2015 deaths
Republican Party Missouri state senators
People from Barry County, Missouri
Missouri State University alumni
University of Missouri alumni
Missouri lawyers
People from Cassville, Missouri
20th-century American lawyers